In the Same Room is a live studio album by American musician Julia Holter, released on March 31, 2017, on Domino Documents. Recorded with her backing band over two days at London's RAK Studios, the album was recorded during the tour for Holter's fourth studio album, Have You in My Wilderness (2015).

The album is the first release of Domino Recording Company's live imprint, Domino Documents.

Track listing

Charts

References

2017 live albums
Julia Holter albums
Domino Recording Company albums
Albums recorded at RAK Studios